Gilla Mo Chaidbeo (also known as Machabeo or Machabeus, died 1174) was a Gaelic-Irish Abbot.

Biography

Known as Machabeus in Latin, Gilla Mo Chaidbeo was abbot of the monastery dedicated to Saint Peter and Saint Paul at Armagh. He served in this capacity for over thirty years, dying in 1174.

Gilla Mo Chaidbeo's death is the last to be commemorated in the Félire húi Gormáin or Martyrology of Gorman, which was written by his contemporary Máel Muire Ua Gormáin (Marianus Gorman) sometime in the second half of the 12th century. The preface suggests that it was written between Ruaidrí Ua Conchobair's accession to the high-kingship in 1166 and the death of Gilla meic Liac mac Diarmata (Gelasius.

Allowing for a few extra days, the former suggestion is made plausible by the record of Gilla meic Liac's death on 27 March and that of Gilla Mo Chaidbeo on 31 March of the same year. However, it has also been argued that these are later insertions, whether by Gorman or another author.

Notes

References
 .
 .
 .

People from County Armagh
1174 deaths
Irish Christian monks
12th-century Christian saints
12th-century Roman Catholic bishops in Ireland
Medieval saints of Ulster
12th-century Irish abbots
Year of birth unknown